Moitessieriidae is a family of small freshwater snails, aquatic gastropod molluscs in the superfamily Truncatelloidea.

According to the taxonomy of the Gastropoda by Bouchet & Rocroi (2005) the family Moitessieriidae has no subfamilies.

There are known 55 freshwater species of Moitessieriidae in the Palearctic region.

Genera 
Genera within the family Moitessieriidae include:
 Atebbania Ghamizi, Bodon, Boulal & Giusti, 1999
 Baldufa Alba, Tarruella, Prats, Guillen & Corbella, 2010
 Bosnidilhia Boeters, Glöer & Pešić, 2013
 Bythiospeum Bourguignat, 1882
 Clameia Boeters & E. Gittenberger, 1990
 Corseria Boeters & Falkner, 2009
 Henrigirardia Boeters & Falkner, 2003
 Iglica A. J. Wagner, 1928
 Lanzaia Brusina, 1906
 Lanzaiopsis Bole, 1989
 Moitessieria Bourguignat, 1863 – type genus
 Palacanthilhiopsis Bernasconi, 1988
 Paladilhia Bourguignat, 1865
 Paladilhiopsis Pavlovic, 1913
 Palaospeum Boeters, 1999
 Sardopaladilhia Manganelli, Bodon, Cianfanelli, Talenti & Giusti, 1998
 Sorholia Boeters & Falkner, 2009
 Spiralix Boeters, 1972
 Trogloiranica Fatemi, Malek-Hosseini, Falniowski, Hofman, Kuntner & Grego, 2019
Synonyms
 Costellina Kuščer, 1933: synonym of Paladilhiopsis (Costellina) Kuščer, 1933 represented as Paladilhiopsis Pavlović, 1913 (original rank)
 Vitrella Clessin, 1877: synonym of Bythiospeum Bourguignat, 1882 (invalid: junior homonym of Vitrella Swainson, 1840; Bythiospeum is a replacement name)

References 

 Bouchet P., Rocroi J.P., Hausdorf B., Kaim A., Kano Y., Nützel A., Parkhaev P., Schrödl M. & Strong E.E. (2017). Revised classification, nomenclator and typification of gastropod and monoplacophoran families. Malacologia. 61(1-2): 1-526.
 Wilke T. (2019). Moitessieriidae Bourguignat, 1863. pp. 122–125, in: C. Lydeard & C.S. Cummings (eds), Freshwater mollusks of the world. A distribution atlas. 242 pp. Baltimore: Johns Hopkins University Press.

External links
 Bourguignat J.R. (1863) Monographie du nouveau genre français Moitessieria. Revue et Magasin de Zoologie, ser. 2, 15(11): 432–445, pls 20–21.
 Falniowski, A.; Prevorčnik, S.; Delić, T.; Alther, R.; Altermatt, F.; Hofman, S. (2019). Monophyly of the Moitessieriidae Bourguignat, 1863 (Caenogastropoda: Truncatelloidea). Folia Malacologica. 27(1): 61-70